Royal FM (95.1 MHz) is a radio station in Ilorin Kwara State, Nigeria.

It was founded in 2011 by Gbenga Adebayo, a telecommunications engineer, and broadcast online before receiving final approval for FM operation later that year.

References

External links

Radio stations established in 2011
Radio stations in Nigeria
Privately held companies of Nigeria
2011 establishments in Nigeria